Anton Heinrich Hermann Fassl (1876, Komotau - 1922, Manaos) was a German entomologist.

Fassl collected Lepidoptera and Coleoptera  in Colombia (1907-1908),  Brazil and Ecuador. He was sometime in Berlin, sometime at a dealership Naturhistorisches-Institut, 948 Zeidlerstrasse, Teplitz, Bohemia, Austria-Hungary (now Teplice, the Czech Republic). He supplied specimens to Ernst Hartert and Karl Jordan.

Works
Fassl, A. H. (1910): Die Raupe einer Uranide. Z. wiss. Insekt. Biol., 6(10): 355.
Fassl, A. H. (1912): Kämpfende Schmetterlinge Entomologische Rundschau 29(10), pp. [71-72]
Fassl, A. H. (1912–13): Tropische Reisen. IV. Muzo, das Land der schönsten Smaragde und Schmetterlinge  Entomologische Rundschau 29(23), pp. 147–149; (24)155-157; 30(1)3-4; (3)14-16.
Fassl, A. H. (1922): Einige kritische Bemerkungen zu J. Röbers Mimikry und verwandte Erscheinungen bei Schmetterlingen"  Entomologische Rundschau 39(4), pp. 15–16; (5)18-19; (6)22
Fassl, A. H. (1922): Einige kritische Bemerkungen zu J. Röbers "Mimikry und verwandte Erscheinungen bei Schmetterlingen" Entomologische Rundschau 39(7), pp. 26–27
 Fassl, A. H. (1924): Nachträge: Gattung Agrias. In: Die Gross- Schmetterlinge der Erde (Seitz, A. ed.), vol. 5, Alfred Kernen, Stuttgart, pp. [1037- 1040; 1041 pl. 113

References
 A. H. Fassl (obituary), Entomologische Zeitschrift, Frankfurt a.M., Feb. 3, 1923 (pdf file)
 Anonym 1925: [Fassl, A. H. H. jun.] Ent. News, Philadelphia 36 : 96

1876 births
1922 deaths
German lepidopterists
People from Chomutov
19th-century German zoologists
20th-century German zoologists
Date of birth missing
Date of death missing